Nevin is a neighborhood in South Los Angeles, California.  It consists of the area surrounding the street and school of the same name.  Broadly construed, the neighborhood is bounded by Washington Boulevard, Alameda Street, Vernon Avenue and Hooper Avenue.  The neighborhood is working-class and industrial in nature; most of the housing stock is apartments or multi-family residential.  It is one of the poorest and most densely populated areas of Los Angeles.  Though the neighborhood, like the rest of South LA once had a predominantly African-American population, today the population is primarily Hispanic and other ethnicities,  still with a large African American minority. The neighborhood is in ZIP codes 90011 and 90058.  Nevin is listed as a populated place by the US Geological Survey.

References

Neighborhoods in Los Angeles